Norway competed at the 1988 Summer Olympics in Seoul. 69 competitors, 44 men and 25 women, took part in 42 events in 11 sports.

Medalists

Competitors
The following is the list of number of competitors in the Games.

Athletics

Men's 5000 metres
 Lars Ove Strømø 
 Heat — did not finish (→ no ranking)

Men's 10,000 metres
 John Halvorsen
 Heat — 28:22.25
 Final — 28:29.21 (→ 16th place)

Women's 10,000 metres
 Ingrid Kristiansen
 Heat — Ingrid Kristiansen
 Final — did not finish (→ no ranking)

Men's Marathon
 Geir Kvernmo — did not finish (→ no ranking)

Women's Marathon
 Sissel Grottenberg — 2"38:17 (→ 36th place)
 Grete Waitz — did not finish (→ no ranking)
 Bente Moe — did not start (→ no ranking)

Men's Shot Put 
 Georg Andersen
 Qualification — 20.05 metres (advanced to the final)
 Final — 19.91 metres (→ 10th place)

Men's Discus Throw 
 Knut Hjeltnes
 Qualification — 63.50 metres
 Final — 64.94 metres (→ 7th place)

 Svein Inge Valvik
 Qualification — 60.64 metres (→ did not advance)

Women's Javelin Throw 
 Trine Hattestad — Final, 58.82 metres (18th place)

Men's 20km Walk
 Erling Andersen — 1:23:30 (→ 22nd place)

Men's 50km Walk
 Erling Andersen — did not finish (→ no ranking)

Canoeing

Cycling

Five cyclists, three men and two women, represented Norway in 1988.

Men's road race
 Atle Pedersen
 Erik Johan Sæbø
 Geir Dahlen

Women's road race
 Unni Larsen — 2:00:52 (→ 20th place)
 Astrid Danielsen — 2:00:52 (→ 35th place)

Diving

Equestrian

Handball

Rowing

Sailing

Shooting

Swimming

Men's 100m Breaststroke
 Jan-Erick Olsen
 Heat — 1:05.54 (→ did not advance, 38th place)

Men's 200m Breaststroke
 Jan-Erick Olsen
 Heat — 2:26.70 (→ did not advance, 41st place)

Women's 400m Freestyle
 Irene Dalby
 Heat — 4:16.22 (→ did not advance, 17th place)

Women's 800m Freestyle
 Irene Dalby
 Heat — 8:38.33 (→ did not advance, 10th place)

Women's 400m Individual Medley
 Irene Dalby
 Heat — 4:58.14 (→ did not advance, 22nd place)

Wrestling

Men's Greco-Roman Light-Flyweight 
Lars Rønningen

Men's Greco-Roman Flyweight 
Jon Rønningen

Men's Greco-Roman Bantamweight 
Ronny Sigde

Men's Greco-Roman Lightweight 
Morten Brekke

Men's Greco-Roman Middleweight 
Stig Kleven

References

Nations at the 1988 Summer Olympics
1988
Summer Olympics